St. John the Baptist's Church, Clowne, is a Grade II* listed Church of England parish church situated in Clowne, a village and civil parish in the Bolsover district of Derbyshire, England. The church, along with the  medieval cross, is the oldest structure in the village.

History
The parish church in Clowne was built in 1138. Originally dedicated as "All Saints", the church stood adjacent on the ridgeway route between Mansfield and Worksop Priory.

The church's dedication was soon changed to John the Baptist and the first rector was John M. Leyaster, who was recorded in 1299. Throughout the churches history there have been a total of 49 rectors.

The tower dates back to the 15th century with the bells added at various times with the first being installed in 1591, then 1616 and finally 1812.

During 1955 the church was extended to accommodate new choir stalls, sanctuary and organ. It was around this time that additional chapels were created on the side; these were used as a children's chapel and the other a miners chapel. The men who lost their lives in the Creswell Colliery Disaster in 1950 are remembered in this chapel.

The church also features stained glass windows and two paintings by Jean Baptiste Butatte, "The Ten Commandments" and "The Ascension". The Creswell Colliery disaster is also remembered on a stained glass window within the chapel.

List of rectors

Organ
A specification of the organ can be found on the National Pipe Organ Register.

Bells
The tower contains a ring of six bells dating from 1932 cast by Mears and Stainbank.

See also
Grade II* listed buildings in Bolsover (district)
Listed buildings in Clowne

References

12th-century church buildings in England
Church of England church buildings in Derbyshire
Grade II* listed churches in Derbyshire
Bolsover District